Calvisano is a comune in the Italian province of Brescia, in Lombardy.

It is the manufacturing base of Lones Spa, manufacturer of Fly Flot shoes. Agritech is a known fiberglass silos company.

Sport 
Its rugby union team, Rugby Calvisano, won the national championship five times (2004-2005, 2007-2008, 2011-2012, 2013-14 and 2016-17).

References

Cities and towns in Lombardy